Teleki is a village in Somogy county, Hungary, about  south of Lake Balaton.

The settlement is part of the Balatonboglár wine region.

External links 
 Street map (Hungarian)

References 

Populated places in Somogy County